Vipin Chhotalal Parikh (26 October 1930 – 18 October 2010) was a Gujarati poet from Gujarat, India.

Life 
Vipin Parikh was born on 26 October 1930 in Bombay (now Mumbai). His family belonged to Chikhli (now in Valsad district, Gujarat). He studied B. Com. from University of Bombay and joined his father in plumbing business. He retired from business. He had studied biochemistry and astrology by himself. He died in Mumbai on 18 October 2010.

Works
Vipin Parikh started writing poetry at later age. He chiefly wrote non-metrical poetry and his poetry is socially concerned and expresses modern sensitivity. He published three poetry collections: Ashanka (1975), Talash (1980) and Coffee House (1998). Mari, Tamari, Aapani Vaat (2003) is an anthology of all his poems. Alinganne Kat Lage Chhe (1999) and Hu Pachho Avish Tyare (2011) are his essay collections. He wrote short biographies on various saints in Shanti Pamade Ene Sant Kahie (1999). Suresh Dalal compiled a book on him under Kavi Ane Kavita series.

See also
 List of Gujarati-language writers

References 

1930 births
2010 deaths
Poets from Gujarat
Gujarati-language writers
Indian male poets
Gujarati-language poets
Writers from Mumbai
20th-century Indian poets
20th-century Indian male writers
Indian essayists
University of Mumbai alumni